Wisconsin Central Ltd.  is a railroad subsidiary of Canadian National. At one time, its parent Wisconsin Central Transportation Corporation owned or operated railroads in the United States, Canada (Algoma Central Railway), the United Kingdom (English Welsh & Scottish), New Zealand (Tranz Rail), and Australia (Australian Transport Network).

Overview

Wisconsin Central Ltd. (WC) started in US in the mid-1980s using most of the original Wisconsin Central Railway's rights of way and some former Milwaukee Road rights of way after the Soo Line Railroad acquired the Wisconsin, Illinois, Indiana, Missouri and Minnesota holdings of the bankrupt Milwaukee Road and divested its older railway trackage in Wisconsin. In 1993 the Wisconsin Central also acquired the Green Bay and Western Railroad and the Fox River Valley Railroad.

In 1995, Wisconsin Central acquired the  Canadian Algoma Central Railway whose tracks ran north of Sault Saint Marie to Hearst, Ontario. The Algoma Central runs a popular tourist passenger train through the Agawa Canyon and Agawa Canyon Wilderness Park near Lake Superior Provincial Park.

In 1996, Chicago commuter rail agency Metra inaugurated service on the WC's Waukesha Subdivision as the North Central Service.

In 2001, the Wisconsin Central was purchased by Canadian National. Along with the former Illinois Central Railroad, the former Wisconsin Central became part of Canadian National's United States holdings and its property integrated into the CN system.

The railroad extended from Chicago into and through Wisconsin to Minneapolis-Saint Paul and Duluth, Minnesota, to Sault Ste Marie, Michigan, and north (through the Algoma Central Railway) to Hearst, Ontario.

Timeline
 January 10, 1986: The Soo Line, nine days after purchasing the Milwaukee Road, creates the Lake States Transportation Division to operate its mainline between Forest Park, Illinois and Minneapolis, Minnesota.
 April 3, 1987: The Soo Line Railroad announces the sale of its Lake States Transportation Division to private investors, forming the new Wisconsin Central Transportation Corporation
 October 11, 1987: The first WC train runs, from Stevens Point to North Fond du Lac, Wisconsin
 May 1991: WC shares begin trading under the ticker symbol WCTC, raising $36.2 million
 1992: Railway Age names Wisconsin Central the Regional Railroad of the Year
 1993: WC acquires the Fox River Valley Railroad and Green Bay & Western railroads
 1993: A Wisconsin Central-led consortium acquires New Zealand Rail through a new subsidiary, Wisconsin Central International, and renames it Tranz Rail in 1995 
 1995: WC acquires the Algoma Central Railway through a new subsidiary, Wisconsin Central Canada Holdings
 1995: A WC-led consortium acquires Rail Express Systems in the United Kingdom from the British Railways Board
 1996: WC partners with Canadian National (CN) and CSX, inaugurating a new intermodal shipping corridor between the west and east coasts of North America
 1996: The Loadhaul, Mainline Freight and Transrail Freight freight operators in the UK are purchased from the British Railways Board and merged as English Welsh & Scottish (EWS)
 March 4, 1996: A Wisconsin Central freight train derails in Weyauwega, Wisconsin; the derailment results in a 16-day evacuation
 August 19, 1996: Metra, a commuter railroad agency based in Chicago, inaugurates its North Central Service route on the WC's Waukesha Subdivision. 
 1997: EWS acquires Railfreight Distribution in the UK from the British Railways Board and merges it into EWS
 1997: Another WC subsidiary, the Sault Ste. Marie Bridge Company, acquires  of track from Union Pacific Railroad forming a WC connection between Green Bay, Wisconsin, and Ishpeming, Michigan
 1997: Australian Transport Network (ATN), in which Wisconsin Central owned a one-third stake, purchased Tasrail in Tasmania, six months later ATN acquired the Emu Bay Railway in Tasmania
 1999: Railway Age names Wisconsin Central president Edward Burkhardt its Railroader of the Year
 January 30, 2001: Wisconsin Central and Canadian National announce plans for CN to purchase WC for $800 million and the assumption of $400 million of WC's debt, it is completed on October 9, 2001
 December 21, 2011: Duluth, Winnipeg & Pacific Railway and Duluth, Missabe & Iron Range Railway, also owned by CN, are merged into Wisconsin Central
 January 1, 2013: Elgin, Joliet and Eastern Railway is merged into Wisconsin Central Ltd indirectly as parent company CN made the acquisition

References

External links
 Soo Line Historical and Technical Society
 WC2scale - Wisconsin Central Motive Power Photo Gallery #1 (extensive online photo source of WC Ltd. equipment)
 RailPictures.Net – Photographs of the Wisconsin Central

Railway companies established in 1987
Canadian National Railway subsidiaries
Illinois railroads
Michigan railroads
Minnesota railroads
Wisconsin railroads
Railroads in the Chicago metropolitan area
Upper Peninsula of Michigan
Predecessors of the Canadian National Railway
Former regional railroads in the United States
Spin-offs of the Canadian Pacific Railway
1987 establishments in Wisconsin